Gloucester City Public Schools is a comprehensive community public school district that serves students in pre-kindergarten through twelfth grade from Gloucester City, in Camden County, New Jersey, United States. The district is one of 31 former Abbott districts statewide that were established pursuant to the decision by the New Jersey Supreme Court in Abbott v. Burke which are now referred to as "SDA Districts" based on the requirement for the state to cover all costs for school building and renovation projects in these districts under the supervision of the New Jersey Schools Development Authority.

As of the 2018–19 school year, the district, comprised of three schools, had an enrollment of 2,189 students and 173.5 classroom teachers (on an FTE basis), for a student–teacher ratio of 12.6:1.

The district is classified by the New Jersey Department of Education as being in District Factor Group "B", the second lowest of eight groupings. District Factor Groups organize districts statewide to allow comparison by common socioeconomic characteristics of the local districts. From lowest socioeconomic status to highest, the categories are A, B, CD, DE, FG, GH, I and J.

Students from Brooklawn attend the district's high school for ninth through twelfth grades as part of a sending/receiving relationship with the Brooklawn Public School District.

Schools
Schools in the district (with 2018–19 enrollment data from the National Center for Education Statistics) are:
Elementary school
Cold Springs Elementary School with 850 students in grades PreK-3)
Karen Kessler, Principal
Middle school
Gloucester City Middle School with 780 students in grades 4-8
William O'Kane, Principal
High school
Gloucester City High School with 515 students in grades 9-12
Sean Gorman, Principal

Administration
Core members of the district's administration are:
Sean Gorman, Superintendent
Teri Weeks, Business Administrator / Board Secretary

Board of education
The district's board of education, comprised of nine members, sets policy and oversees the fiscal and educational operation of the district through its administration. As a Type II school district, the board's trustees are elected directly by voters to serve three-year terms of office on a staggered basis, with three seats up for election each year held (since 2012) as part of the November general election. The board appoints a superintendent to oversee the district's day-to-day operations and a business administrator to supervise the business functions of the district. The board includes a tenth member appointed to represent Brooklawn.

References

External links
Gloucester City Public Schools
 
School Data for the Gloucester City Public Schools, National Center for Education Statistics

Gloucester City, New Jersey
New Jersey Abbott Districts
New Jersey District Factor Group B
School districts in Camden County, New Jersey